Race Differences in Intelligence: An Evolutionary Analysis is a 2006 book by controversial race and intelligence writer Richard Lynn. The book reviews selected literature on IQ testing and argues that genetic racial differences exist, with a discussion of the causes and consequences. Reviews of the book fault the selection of data used, the methodology, and the conclusions drawn from the data, resulting in criticism that it is "the sort of book that gives IQ testing a bad name."

Summary
As with Lynn's and Tatu Vanhanen's 2006 book IQ and Global Inequality, the book was published by Washington Summit Publishers. It was followed in 2008 by The Global Bell Curve. Lynn's survey is an expansion by nearly four times of the data collected in his 2002 book IQ and the Wealth of Nations with Tatu Vanhanen, which dealt with the relationship between IQ and economic development.

The book claims to represent the largest collection and review of the global Intelligence Quotient (IQ) data, surveying 620 published studies from around the world, with a total of 813,778 tested individuals.

Lynn defines races as the genetic clusters or ancestral population groups identified in previous genetic cluster analysis by Luigi Cavalli-Sforza and his colleagues in their  1994 book The History and Geography of Human Genes. Many current ethnic groups would be mixtures of these races.

Reception
Psychology professor J. Philippe Rushton, who argued for many of the same conclusions as Lynn and served with Lynn on the board of the Pioneer Fund, wrote a favorable review and called it Lynn's "crowning achievement".

In a 2008 review of the data used in Lynn's book, Hunt and Wittmann write:

A review by Nicholas Mackintosh, Emeritus Professor in the Department of Experimental Psychology, University of Cambridge, expresses astonishment that Lynn infers that Kalahari bushmen, with an average measured IQ of 54, should be regarded as mentally retarded; and that an 8-year-old European child with the equivalent mental age would have no problems surviving in the same desert environment. Mackintosh questions Lynn's hypothesis that migration to more harsh northern climates and ice ages selected for higher IQ by pointing to harshness of environments such as the Australian Outback. Lynn argues that racial differences in brain size indicates different evolutionary pressure on intelligence. Mackintosh argues that the cranial capacity of early Homo sapiens, 100,000 or more years ago, was rather greater than that of modern Europeans. He criticizes Lynn for reporting data incorrectly, in some cases from studies by Mackintosh himself. He writes: "The errors may not be particularly important, and I do not know how typical they are. But they do not increase my confidence in Lynn's scholarship." He also writes:

A review by John C. Loehlin, University of Texas Professor emeritus, argues that the general trends in the data that Lynn presents are probably dependable, but faults Lynn for carelessness in how his conclusions are presented.  Loehlin summarizes his view of the book as follows:

See also
 Race and intelligence
 Evolution of human intelligence
 Intelligence and public policy

References

2006 books
Books about human intelligence
Race and intelligence controversy
Books by Richard Lynn